"The Wind Cries Mary" is a rock ballad written by Jimi Hendrix. Hendrix wrote the song as a reconciliatory love song for his girlfriend in London, Kathy Mary Etchingham. More recent biographical material indicated that some of the lyrics appeared in poetry written by Hendrix earlier in his career when he was in Seattle.

Background and recording
According to his then girlfriend, Kathy Etchingham's, account, he wrote the lyrics after an argument with her about her cooking lumpy mashed potatoes, using "Mary" (Etchingham's middle name).  Etchingham suggested that the line in the song "a broom is drearily sweeping up the broken pieces of yesterday's life" represents Hendrix sweeping up the broken dishes she threw as a result of the argument.  In a later interview, Hendrix commented that the lyrics represent "more than one person".  Music journalist David Stubbs pointed out that Hendrix also used the line from the song “Somewhere a Queen is weeping / Somewhere a King has no wife" in a poem he wrote to another Mary who had been his girlfriend, Mary Washington.

Billy Cox, Hendrix's long-time friend and later bassist, has noted Curtis Mayfield's influence on the song.  Hendrix performed elements of an early version in the summer of 1966 with his band Jimmy James and the Blue Flames in New York City.

The Experience recorded it at De Lane Lea Studios in London in February 1967, during sessions for their follow-up single to "Hey Joe".  Hendrix producer Chas Chandler commented on the recording:

The single, backed by "Highway Chile", was released in the UK in May 1967 and reached number six on the UK Singles Chart.  In the United States, the song was first released as the B-side of the "Purple Haze" single in June 1967.  It was later included on the American Are You Experienced album, released in August 1967.

More recent biographical material has indicated that some of the lyrics appeared in poetry written by Hendrix earlier in his career when he was in Seattle. According to his previous girlfriend from Seattle, Mary Washington, the words "Somewhere a Queen is weeping/ Somewhere a King has no wife," were written in a love poem Hendrix had written for her.

Performance
Hendrix often performed the song live in 1967 and 1968.  A recording from the Monterey Pop Festival was later released on Jimi Plays Monterey (1986) and Live at Monterey (2007); another from the Paris L'Olympia Theatre appeared on  Stages (1991), The Jimi Hendrix Experience (2000), and Live in Paris & Ottawa 1968 (2008).  Stages also includes a 1967 recording from a Stockholm concert.

Impact and legacy
Rolling Stone magazine ranked "The Wind Cries Mary" number 379 on its list of the "500 Greatest Songs of All Time".  A variety of musicians have recorded the song, such as Jamie Cullum, John Mayer, Xavier Rudd, Richie Sambora, Sting, Popa Chubby, Pat Boone, and Caron Wheeler, and Johnny A.  Gil Evans later reworked the song as "Mademoiselle Mabry" for Miles Davis' album Filles de Kilimanjaro.

References

External links
 

1960s ballads
1967 songs
1967 singles
The Jimi Hendrix Experience songs
Track Records singles
Songs written by Jimi Hendrix
Song recordings produced by Chas Chandler
Rock ballads